Oliver's Wharf is a Grade II listed apartment building and former warehouse on the River Thames in Wapping High Street, Wapping, London.

History

Construction
The warehouse was built in 1870 by architects Frederick and Horace Francis to store tea and other cargo. It had a capacity of 60,000 packages.

Conversion to housing
In 1972, Oliver's Wharf was converted into luxury apartments by Tony Goddard of Goddard Manton Partnership. It is the first of Wapping's, and one of the first Docklands warehouses altogether, to undergo such a conversion.

References

Buildings and structures in the London Borough of Tower Hamlets
Grade II listed buildings in the London Borough of Tower Hamlets